KidZania Mumbai is a global indoor theme park, located in R-City Mall, Ghatkopar, Mumbai, India. It is a family entertainment centre for children in the age group of 4 to 16 to enhance their social and cognitive skills. Opened in August 2013, KidZania Mumbai is India's first, and the world's 14th KidZania theme park.

Overview
KidZania Mumbai operates like a real city that is built-to-scale for children, with paved roads and cars, city buildings, recognizable establishments, a functioning economy and its own currency. Designed for children aged 4 to 16, KidZania Mumbai houses more than 60 real-world establishments (Yes Bank, Coca-Cola, The Times of India, DHL, etc.) and 100+ activities to help children develop real life skills. At KidZania, children perform 'jobs' and are either paid for their work (as a stylist, fireman, radio jockey, surgeon, dentist, etc.) or pay to get a service (university, culinary school, department store, driving school, etc.). Unique to KidZania Mumbai, children can also experience local establishments like the Bollywood Acting Academy, Pottery Studio and the Dabbawalla service (boxed lunch delivery). KidZania gives kids the opportunity to play adult roles by allowing them to emulate, re-enact and participate in adult activities and experiences.

History
KidZania was created and developed by Mexican entrepreneur Xavier López Ancona. The first KidZania opened in September 1999, in Santa Fe Shopping Mall in Mexico City, and was named La Ciudad de los Niños ("The City of the Children"). Today there are 24 KidZania Theme Parks operational around the world with 10 more to be launched by the end of 2020. KidZania has received more than 35 million guests around the world since its opening, making it one of the fastest growing global edutainment brands in the world.

KidZania has been brought to the domestic market by ImagiNation Edutainment India, which is promoted by Bollywood star Shahrukh Khan, with 26 percent stake, and KidZ Inc of Singapore, which holds the remaining 74 percent. KidZ Inc. is co-owned by the Comcraft, Xander & Maxfield Management Ltd. Groups.

Age eligibility
Children between 4 and 16 years of age can participate in the role-playing activities at KidZania. However, some activities may have a height and age restriction.

Toddlers (aged between 2 and 4 years) have a separate section with play-areas earmarked for them, called Urbano's House, and can participate in some of the role-playing activities.

Babies (below the age of 2 years) can relax and enjoy in the play-areas at Urbano's House.

Adults and parents can observe their children role-playing in various activities, or spend time in the Pepperfry Parents Lounge. There are some establishments, like the Star TV Studio or the Theatre, where they can witness the activities inside the establishments from the seating area. However, adults are not allowed within the KidZania premises unless they are accompanying children.

Awards
KidZania Mumbai has won many awards from various organizations for value, uniqueness and future potential, including:
 Best Destination for Kids by 4th World Children Expo
 The Best New Concept by Kids by 4th World Children Expo
 The Most Admired Retail Concept Launch of the Year by India Retail Forum 2014
 Emerging Brand Award by Global Marketing Excellence 2014
 Rotary Club of Mumbai Green City Appreciation Award 2014
 Indian Development Foundation CSR Award for year 2013-14

Industry partners

 Amity University
 Bajaj Electricals
 Big Bazaar
 Birla Sun Life Insurance
 Cadbury Dairy Milk
 Central
 Club Mahindra
 Coca-Cola
 DHL
 Ezone
 Frooti
 Furtados School of Music
 Godrej Security Solutions
 Hardy's
 HealthSpring
 Hyundai
 Kansai Nerolac Paints
 Kellogg's Chocos
 Kokuyo Camlin
 Mad Over Donuts
 Nutella
 Parachute Advanced
 Parle Products
 Pepperfry
 Radio City
 Sbarro
 Shiamak Davar International
 STAR TV
 The Times of India
 Toonz Animation
 Yes Bank
 Zespri

References

Tourist attractions in Mumbai
Kidzania theme parks